Hon. William Pattison (23 May 1830 – 8 June 1896) was a politician in colonial Queensland, Australia. He was a Member of the Queensland Legislative Assembly.

Early life 
Pattison was born in Hobart, Van Diemen's Land (later renamed Tasmania) but emigrated to Victoria and was a councillor of the city of Melbourne.

In August 1864, Pattison  went to Queensland, and commenced business at Rockhampton, where he acquired a large interest in the Mount Morgan Gold Mining Company.

Politics 
Pattison, who has been Mayor of Rockhampton, succeeded Archibald Archer in the representation of Blackall in 1886, was elected for Rockhampton in 1888, and was a minister without portfolio in the Thomas McIlwraith ministry from June to November 1888. On the reconstitution of the Ministry he was Colonial Treasurer under Boyd Dunlop Morehead from November 1888 to November 1889, when he resigned the Treasurership. He was minister without portfolio till the retirement of the Morehead Government in August 1890.

Later life 
In June 1893 Pattison donated £1000 to erect St Andrew's Presbyterian Church in Rockhampton.

Pattison died in 1896 and was buried in South Rockhampton Cemetery.

References

1830 births
1896 deaths
Members of the Queensland Legislative Assembly
Politicians from Hobart
Treasurers of Queensland
19th-century Australian politicians
Australian butchers